Living with the Living is the fifth album by the Washington, D.C. rock band Ted Leo and the Pharmacists, released in 2007 by Touch and Go Records. It was the band's first album for the Touch and Go label and debuted on the U.S. Billboard 200 at number 109, selling about 8,000 copies in its first week. Music videos were filmed for the singles "Bomb. Repeat. Bomb." and "Colleen". The iTunes download version of the album included a bonus track entitled "The Vain Parade", while first-run copies of the CD version included the bonus Mo' Living EP.

Critical reception

Corey Apar from AllMusic praised Leo's overall musicianship for remaining consistent alongside his previous works in terms of emotional resonance and politically minded savviness but was hoping for something a little more extraordinary that showed Leo pushing further from his comfort zone. Rolling Stones Christian Hoard noted the "unusually spry riddims" Leo uses when delivering his political lyricism but felt it lacked memorability. Gabbie Nirenburg, writing for No Ripcord, said about the record, "[T]he songs are flat and unoriginal rock. Ted's voice and vocal range is exemplary, but it's the only real star on this record. Nothing sticks the way it should. Perhaps it's a bigger blow to my system because I've come to expect such greatness from Ted Leo."

Track listing

Personnel
Ted Leo – guitar, vocals, other instrumentation
Dave Lerner – bass
Chris Wilson – drums

Album information
Record label: Touch and Go Records
Recorded September 24, 2006 – October 5, 2006 at Longview Farms in North Brookfield, Massachusetts with engineering by Ian Neill, and October 8, 2006 – October 14, 2006 at Blind Spot Studios in Washington, D.C. with engineering by Brendan Canty
Mixed October 15, 2006 – October 22, 2006 at Blind Spot Studios in Washington, D.C. by Ted Leo and Brendan Canty
Mastered November 28, 2006 at SAE Studios in Phoenix, Arizona by Roger Seibel
Design by Jodi V.B. and Ida Pearle
Photography by Shawn Brackbill

References

2007 albums
Ted Leo and the Pharmacists albums
Touch and Go Records albums